Paulaseer Lawrie Muthukrishna (24 February 1921 24 February 1989); was an Indian preacher who had followers worldwide. He is known for his faith-healing movement and initiated the "One God, One Nation movement" in India. He was a follower and promoter of the teachings of William  Branham.

Early life, education and early career
R. Paulaseer Lawrie was born to father, Deva Rasiah, and mother, Nesammal, at the Lakshmi Tea Estate in Munnar, Kerala.
  
Soon after his birth, the family moved to Ceylon (now Sri Lanka). Paulaseer stayed back to study at St. John's College, located in Palayamkottai, Tamil Nadu. After finishing the intermediate class of university studies, he went to Ceylon and studied commercial subjects for one year. He then went to Wesley College, Colombo, located in Colombo to gain the London Matric certificate.

After this, he went back to Madras, Tamil Nadu, and joined the Christian College, located in Tambaram, Tamil Nadu, for a Bachelor of Arts degree. As World War II began, a vigorous recruiting for officers was afoot. Paulaseer wanted to join the Indian Army and took some training. On knowing this, his father came over and forced Paulaseer to return with him to Ceylon. Paulaseer came back to India to continue his studies. He got a seat in St. Xavier's College, located in Palayamkottai, Tamil Nadu.

In August 1942, when the national leaders launched the Quit India Movement, he organized a big student strike in his college. The police attempted to apprehend him, but he managed to escape to Ceylon where, soon after arrival, he got a job in one of the tea estates as a stenographer. Around this time Paulaseer began to read political and religious works and to have visions. In 1946, he went to India on a short holiday. While going with his mother to a friend's house, he saw everything according to the dreams he had had about his wife-to-be. Thus assured that the girl in that house was the one chosen by the Lord, he consented to marry, and they were engaged. His mother was there, but his father was in Ceylon. So the marriage had to be postponed for six months; it occurred 26 May 1947.

When his first child was seriously ill, Paulaseer prayed and promised to devote his life to God if the child recovered. After his son's recovery, he resigned his job in Ceylon and returned to India. He took a job on the Yercaud Estate, located in Tamil Nadu, and later at the Christian Medical College Hospital, (CMCH)located in Vellore, Tamil Nadu.

See also
 List of 20th-century religious leaders
 List of people from Kerala
 List of people from Tamil Nadu
 List of Protestant missionaries in India

References

External links
 
 Manujothi Ashram

Place of death missing
1921 births
1989 deaths
20th-century Christian clergy
20th-century Indian educators
Faith healers
Christian clergy from Kerala
Indian evangelicals
People from Colombo
People from Idukki district
People from Tirunelveli district